The 1997–98 Illinois State Redbirds men's basketball team represented Illinois State University during the 1997–98 NCAA Division I men's basketball season. The Redbirds, led by fifth year head coach Kevin Stallings, played their home games at Redbird Arena and were a member of the Missouri Valley Conference.

The Redbirds finished the season 25–6, 16–2 in conference play to finish in first place. They were the number one seed for the Missouri Valley Conference tournament. They won their quarterfinal game versus Southern Illinois University, semifinal game versus the Wichita State University, and final game versus Southwest Missouri State University to earn the championship title.

The Redbirds received the conference automatic bid into the 1998 NCAA Division I men's basketball tournament. They were assigned to the Midwest Regional as the number eleven seed where they defeated the University of Tennessee in the first round and were beaten by the University of Arizona in the second round.

Roster

Schedule

|-
!colspan=9 style=|Regular Season

|-
!colspan=9 style=|Missouri Valley Conference {MVC} tournament

|-
!colspan=9 style=|National Collegiate Athletic Association {NCAA} tournament

References

Illinois State Redbirds men's basketball seasons
Illinois State
Illinois State